USA Records was an American, Chicago based independent record label. Jim Golden started the USA label as part of Chicago's Allstate Distributors in 1960, which was owned by Paul Glass.  USA Record Co., Inc. had its office at 1448 South Michigan Avenue, Chicago, Illinois 60605, which was across the street from Chess Records and Glass's Allstate Distributors, Chess' regional distributor.  While USA had a few regional hits, their biggest hit came in 1967 with the chart-topping "Kind of a Drag" by The Buckinghams.  The label lasted until 1969.

USA Records worldwide rights were acquired by 43 North Broadway, LLC in 2015.

External links

1960 establishments in Illinois
1969 disestablishments in the United States
Defunct companies based in Chicago
Defunct record labels of the United States
Record labels disestablished in 1969
Record labels established in 1960